20th Century Masters – The Millennium Collection: The Best of Wang Chung is the second of two compilation albums by English new wave band Wang Chung. Released in the fall of 2002, this compilation album contains all eight of the band's charted singles from 1984 through 1989. The album also includes "Wait" from Points on the Curve (1983), "What's So Bad About Feeling Good?" from The Warmer Side of Cool (1989), and "Space Junk (Wang Chung '97)" from the previous compilation. "What's So Bad About Feeling Good?" is the only song from the 1982–1989 period to not appear on any chart in the US or the UK, and still make the cut for a Wang Chung compilation album.

Track listing

References

Wang Chung
Wang Chung (band) compilation albums
2002 greatest hits albums
Geffen Records compilation albums
Albums produced by Peter Wolf